The Atlin Arts & Music Festival (AAMF) is an annual arts and music festival directed towards families located in Atlin, British Columbia. The festival has hosted acts such as Michelle Wright, Sloan, Delhi 2 Dublin, Iskwé, Rock Plaza Central, Harpoonist & The Axe Murderer, The Olympic Symphonium, Matt Epp, and David Francey. It also hosts a visual artists as well as art and music workshops. The annual "Atlin Mini-Marathon" is held during the festival weekend.

On average, 2,500 people attend every year and roughly 300 people volunteer during the festival weekend. The Yukon Ski Patrol provides First Aid services at the festival. Every year the festival is commenced by the Taku Kwaan Dancers (People of the Taku), a group of local Taku River Tlingit traditional First Nations dancers.

The Atlin Arts & Music Festival also has many musical artists based in or from Yukon Territory perform at the festival, including Sarah MacDougall, Major Funk & The Employment, Calla Kinglit, Speed Control, Kevin Barr and his son Jonah Barr's band "Old Cabin", Fawn Fritzen, Nicole Edwards, Declan O'Donovan, Claire Ness, Ivan Coyote, Diyet, Soda Pony, Kim Beggs, Ryan McNally, Cryptozoologists, and Soir de Semaine. The festival features a varied line-up when it comes to music genres including rock, jazz, hip hop, folk, country, blues, zydeco, electronica, Americana, heavy metal, bluegrass, power pop, and indie music.

Musical headliners, 2009-present

2009
Colin Linden, Stephen Fearing, Delhi 2 Dublin, Patty Larkin
Dates: July 10–12, 2009

2011
Tom Jackson, Annabelle Chvostek, Tanya Tagaq, Madison Violet
Dates: July 8–10, 2011

2012
David Grisman FolkJazz Trio, David Lindley, Gary Comeau & The Voodoo Allstars, Don Amero, Dwayne Cōté & Duane Andrews, Del Barber
Dates: July 6–8, 2012

2013
Harry Manx, The Gibson Brothers, Hawksley Workman, Michelle Wright, Mike Stevens
Dates: July 12–14, 2013

2014
Gord Downie, The Sadies, Danny Michel, Dave Bidini, David Francey, Alex Cuba, Alexis Normand, Ashley Condon, Good for Grapes
Dates: July 11–13, 2014

2015
Ian Tyson, James Keelaghan, Death, Danny Michel Trio, California Feetwarmers, Anna & Elizabeth, Bongeziwe Mabandla
Dates: July 10–12, 2015

2016
Bruce Cockburn, Harpoonist & The Axe Murderer, Ghostkeeper
Dates: July 8–10, 2016

2017
Joel Plaskett Emergency / Joel & Bill Plaskett, Ben Caplan, Rose Cousins, Moe Clark, Iskwé, Sweet Alibi, Antarcticus, Dakhká Khwáan & DJ Dash, Matt Epp, Patrick Jacobson, Calla Kinglit
Dates: July 7–9, 2017

2018
Sloan, Willie Nile, Roy Forbes, The Dungarees, Raine Hamilton, Sarah MacDougall & Ivan Coyote, Diyet, Speed Control, Ryan McNally
Dates: July 6–8, 2018

2019
Said the Whale, Dan Mangan, Terra Lightfoot, DJ Shub, Holly McNarland, Bob Log III, Tiller's Folly, Sarah MacDougall, The Heels, Ivan Coyote, Local Boy, Communism
Dates: July 12–14, 2019

History
The Atlin Arts & Music Festival was founded in January 2003, and in July of that year 800 people attended the inaugural event. Attendance in later years reached up to 3,500 people. No festival took place in 2010.

The festival was cancelled in 2020 due to the COVID-19 pandemic, and has not been held in subsequent years.

Stages
The main festival grounds are located in Tarahne Park (in which the Air North Stage is located). Tarahne Park is located next to Atlin Lake (one of the largest natural lakes in British Columbia). There are three main stages in Atlin that are in use during the festival: the Lake Stage (otherwise known as the Atlin Mountain Inn Stage), a large tent located beside Atlin Lake; the Globe Theatre; and the Air North Stage, the largest of the three.

See also 
Atlin, British Columbia
Music of Yukon

References

External links
 Official Website
 Facebook

Music festivals in British Columbia
Music festivals established in 2003
Rock festivals in Canada